The 1990 European Athletics Indoor Championships were held in Glasgow, United Kingdom, on 3 and 4 March 1990. It was the last time that the event had been held annually and not biennially as it is now, as well as the last time that it was held over only two days. It also marked the debut of the women's triple jump event.

The medal table was topped by the Soviet Union, followed by West and East Germany.

Medal summary

Men

Women

Medal table

Participating nations

 (1)
 (8)
 (4)
 (6)
 (3)
 (20)
 (2)
 (21)
 (6)
 (23)
 (49)
 (11)
 (12)
 (3)
 (7)
 (31)
 (4)
 (6)
 (7)
 (13)
 (13)
 (28)
 (32)
 (13)
 (4)
 (2)
 (38)
 (6)

See also
1990 in athletics (track and field)

External links
 Results - men at GBRathletics.com
 Results - women at GBRathletics.com
 EAA

 
1990
European Athletics Indoor Championships
European Athletics Indoor Championships
International athletics competitions hosted by Scotland
International sports competitions in Glasgow
European Athletics Indoor Championships
1990s in Glasgow